Don Juan Alonso de Guzmán y Cabrera, 1st Count of Niebla  or Juan Alonso Pérez de Guzmán y Osorio (20 December 1342 – 5 October 1396) (Sp.:Juan Alonso de Guzmán y Cabrera, conde de Niebla) was the first Count of Niebla. He was a descendant of Alonso Pérez de Guzmán.

The Counts of Niebla, existed from no later than 8 June 1369 by the second marriage of Juan Alonso de Guzman y Cabrera, also named Juan Alonso de Guzman y Osorio (1342–1396), who was married twice, first to Juana Enriquez (d. 1376), and then Beatriz de Castilla y Ponce de Leon (d. 1409), an illegitimate daughter of Henry II of Castile.

1342 births
1396 deaths
14th-century Castilians
Counts of Spain